The Alfred E. Smith Memorial Foundation Dinner, commonly known as the Al Smith Dinner, is an annual white tie dinner in New York City to raise funds for Catholic charities supporting children of various needs in the Archdiocese of New York. Held at New York City's Waldorf-Astoria Hotel on the third Thursday of October, it is hosted by the Archbishop of New York. It is organized by the Alfred E. Smith Memorial Foundation in honor of Al Smith, who grew up in poverty and later became the Governor of New York four times and the first Catholic nominated as the Democratic candidate for the 1928 United States presidential election.

Cardinal Francis Spellman founded and hosted the first dinner in 1945 after Smith's death the previous year. By 1960, the Al Smith dinner had become a "ritual of American politics", in the words of Theodore H. White. It is generally the last event at which the two U.S. presidential candidates share a stage before the election. Apart from presidential candidates, keynote speakers have included Tony Blair, Tom Brokaw, Bob Hope, Henry Kissinger, Clare Boothe Luce, and many other prominent civic, business, and church leaders.

History

Since 1960, when John F. Kennedy (who would become the first Roman Catholic president) and Richard Nixon were speakers, it has been a stop for the two main presidential candidates during several U.S. election years. In 1976, Jimmy Carter and Gerald Ford spoke; in 1980, Carter and Ronald Reagan; in 1988, George H. W. Bush and Michael Dukakis; in 2000, Al Gore and George W. Bush; in 2008, Barack Obama and John McCain; in 2012, Barack Obama  and Mitt Romney  in 2016, Hillary Clinton and Donald Trump; and in 2020, Trump and Joe Biden. Candidates have traditionally given humorous speeches poking fun at themselves and their opponents, making the event similar to a roast. The 2018 dinner raised $3.9 million.

Since 1980, this custom has been affected by friction between the Democratic Party and the Catholic Church over abortion. During the 1980 dinner, Democratic incumbent Jimmy Carter was booed. In 1984, Ronald Reagan spoke, but his opponent, Walter Mondale, opted out, saying he needed time to prepare for an upcoming presidential debate. Amy Sullivan suggests that Mondale's decision was motivated by "tensions between the Catholic Church and the Democratic Party."

In 1996 and 2004, the Archdiocese of New York chose not to invite the presidential candidates. In 1996, this was reportedly because Cardinal John Joseph O'Connor was angry at Democratic nominee Bill Clinton for vetoing a bill outlawing some late-term abortions. The organizers' explanation was that the candidates had been unable to commit to attending the dinner. The vice-presidential candidates spoke instead. In 2004, Archdiocese spokesman Joseph Zwilling explained that the candidates were not invited because "the issues in this year's campaign could provoke division and disagreement," but some speculated that the decision was due to Democratic nominee (and Roman Catholic) John Kerry's pro-choice stance on abortion.

On October 20, 2016, Hillary Clinton and Donald Trump spoke at the dinner which was hosted by Cardinal Timothy M. Dolan who was seated between the two presidential candidates during the event. During the dinner, Trump made numerous remarks about Hillary Clinton, including references to the hacking of the email server of the Democratic National Committee, her supposed corruption, and her back room dealings with Wall Street elites. The 2016 dinner drew 10.3 million viewers and raised a record-breaking $6 million for Catholic charities. The 2020 dinner occurred in a virtual format, due to the COVID-19 pandemic in New York City, and the traditional roast-like nature was abandoned; still, it was attended by Joe Biden and Trump; both men discussed Catholicism.

In media
During the 2000 dinner, George W. Bush joked, "This is an impressive crowd. The haves and the have-mores. Some people call you the elite. I call you my base." The quote was used in Fahrenheit 9/11 and subsequently in one of John Kerry's 2004 campaign speeches.

The dinner was the subject of an episode of The West Wing titled "The Al Smith Dinner".

See also
 Gridiron Club Dinner
 International Debutante Ball
 United States presidential inaugural balls
 Viennese Opera Ball in New York
 White House Correspondents' Dinner

References

External links

  - 

Charity events in the United States
Catholic Church in the United States
Annual events in New York City
Recurring events established in 1945
Roast (comedy)
Catholic culture
Catholic charities
1945 establishments in New York City